Theodore "Ted" Sider is an American philosopher specializing in metaphysics and philosophy of language.  He is Distinguished Professor of Philosophy at Rutgers University.

Family
Sider is the son of theologian Ronald Sider. He is the partner of Jill North, who is also hired by Rutgers' philosophy faculty.

Education and career
Since earning his Ph.D. from the University of Massachusetts Amherst in 1993, Sider has taught at the University of Rochester, Syracuse University, New York University, Cornell University, and Rutgers University from 2002 to 2007 and, again, since 2015.  Sider has published three books and some four dozen papers.  He has also edited a textbook in metaphysics with John Hawthorne and Dean Zimmerman.

Sider was the recipient of the 2003 APA Book Prize for his book, Four-Dimensionalism: An Ontology of Persistence and Time.  He gave the John Locke Lectures at Oxford University in 2016.

Books 
Four-Dimensionalism: An Ontology of Persistence and Time (2001). Oxford University Press; Japanese (2007)  Shunjusha.
Riddles of Existence: A Guided Tour of Metaphysics (co-author Earl Conee) (2005). Oxford University Press; Japanese  (2009). Shunjusha; Portuguese (2010). Bizâncio.
Logic for Philosophy (2010). Oxford University Press.
Writing the Book of the World (2011). Oxford University Press.
 The Tools of Metaphysics and the Metaphysics of Science (2020). Oxford University Press

References

External links 
 Ted Sider's personal web page 
 Sider's page on the NYU Philosophy Department site
 Sider's page on the Rutgers University Philosophy Department site

20th-century American philosophers
21st-century American philosophers
Analytic philosophers
Year of birth missing (living people)
Metaphysicians
University of Massachusetts Amherst alumni
University of Rochester faculty
Syracuse University faculty
Rutgers University faculty
New York University faculty
Cornell University faculty
Living people
Distinguished professors of philosophy